Am I Blue is an album by American jazz guitarist Grant Green featuring performances recorded in 1963 and released on the Blue Note label. The first two tracks had both been recorded by Ray Charles. “Sweet Slumber” was a 1940s hit for swing band leader Lucky Millinder. Green is heard in a quintet with tenor saxophonist Joe Henderson, trumpeter Johnny Coles, organist Big John Patton and drummer Ben Dixon.

Reception
The Allmusic review by Scott Yanow awarded the album 3½ stars and stated "Although certainly listenable enough, this is one of Grant Green's lesser efforts from the 1960s".

Track listing

 "Am I Blue" (Harry Akst, Grant Clarke) - 6:56
 "Take These Chains from My Heart" (Hy Heath, Fred Rose) - 6:12
 "I Wanna Be Loved" (Johnny Green, Edward Heyman, Billy Rose) - 7:39
 "Sweet Slumber" (Lucky Millinder, Al J. Neiburg, Henri Woode) - 7:17
 "For All We Know" (J. Fred Coots, Sam M. Lewis) - 13:59

Personnel
Grant Green - guitar
Johnny Coles - trumpet
Joe Henderson - tenor saxophone
"Big" John Patton - organ
Ben Dixon - drums

References 

Blue Note Records albums
Grant Green albums
1964 albums
Albums produced by Alfred Lion
Albums recorded at Van Gelder Studio